The Richard B. Petzold Building, also known as the Noble Building, is an historic building in Oregon City, Oregon, United States. It was completed , and has been listed on the National Register of Historic Places.

See also
 National Register of Historic Places listings in Clackamas County, Oregon

References

External links
 

1905 establishments in Oregon
Buildings and structures completed in 1905
Buildings and structures in Oregon City, Oregon
National Register of Historic Places in Clackamas County, Oregon